Alexander Johnston Muir (10 December 1923 – 4 September 1995) was a Scottish footballer who played as a defender.

References

External links
 LFC History profile

1923 births
1995 deaths
Scottish footballers
Liverpool F.C. players
South Liverpool F.C. players
Place of birth missing
Association football defenders
Lochgelly Albert F.C. players
People from Inverkeithing
Footballers from Fife
Scottish Junior Football Association players
English Football League players